James-Lorah House, also known as the Judge Chapman House and VIA House, is a historic home located in Doylestown, Bucks County, Pennsylvania. It was built about 1844, and is a -story, stuccoed townhouse dwelling with a medium gable roof. It has a -story rear wing with a high gable roof and end chimney.  The house features eyebrow windows and marble entrance steps.  It was built for Henry Chapman, who served in the U.S. House of Representatives. It was the birthplace of Henry Chapman Mercer on June 24, 1856.

It was added to the National Register of Historic Places in 1972.

References

Houses on the National Register of Historic Places in Pennsylvania
Houses completed in 1844
Houses in Bucks County, Pennsylvania
National Register of Historic Places in Bucks County, Pennsylvania
Individually listed contributing properties to historic districts on the National Register in Pennsylvania